Acetes japonicus is a shrimp species from the family Sergestidae. It occurs in the western Pacific Ocean and northern Indian Ocean, between Arabian Sea and the Yellow Sea. It is the species of wild shrimp or prawn with the highest reported annual catch, 402 thousand tonnes in 2019, fished by China and South Korea.

References 

Dendrobranchiata
Edible crustaceans
Crustaceans of the Indian Ocean
Crustaceans of the Pacific Ocean
Crustaceans described in 1905